The Expedition of Qatan, was the first Raid on the Banu Asad bin Khuzaymah tribe, which occurred directly after the Battle of Hamra al-Asad in the year 4 A.H of the Islamic calendar.

Background 
Banu Asad ibn Khuzaymah tribe (not to be confused with the Banu Asad tribe), were the residents of Qatan, in the vicinity of Fayd, was a powerful tribe connected with the Quraysh. They resided near the hill of Qatan in Nejd. It was one of the many Muhammad's ghazwa in order to spread Islam. So he dispatched a force of 150 men under the leadership of Abu Salama `Abd Allah ibn `Abd al-Asad to make a sudden attack on this tribe on the first day of Muharram.

Raid 
When the Muslims arrived at the site the tribe members fled and the Muslims found three herdsmen with a large herd of camels and goats. Then the booty, along with the three captives, was brought to Medina.

On the rule on Ghanimah, (plunder), the Dictionary of Islam writes, "If the Imam, or the leader of the Muslim army, conquers a country by force of arms, he is at liberty to leave the land in possession of the original proprietors, provided they pay tribute, or he may divide it amongst the Muslims; but with regard to movable property, it is unlawful for him to leave it in possession of the infidels, but he must bring it away with the army and divide it amongst the soldiers". For this reason, the goats were taken back to Medina (as they are movable objects).

Abu Salamah had an inflammation from a previous wound, and he died.

The 2nd raid of the Banu Asad ibn Khuzaymah tribe took place almost 3 years later.

Islamic sources

Biographical literature
This event is mentioned in Ibn Sa’d's biography of Muhammad. The Muslim jurist Ibn Qayyim Al-Jawziyya also mentions the event in his biography of Muhammad, Zad al-Ma'ad. Modern secondary sources which mention this, include the award-winning book, Ar-Raheeq Al-Makhtum (The Sealed Nectar)

Hadith literature
This is where the raid took place.

 states:

See also 
Military career of Muhammad
List of expeditions of Muhammad
Muslim–Quraysh War

References

Notes

625
Campaigns ordered by Muhammad